Frank Ronald Parsons (born 29 October 1947) is an English-born, former professional footballer who represented Wales at under-23 level. He  played as a goalkeeper in the Football League for Crystal Palace, Cardiff City and Reading, in addition to a brief spell at Fulham where he did not make an appearance. He also played non-league football for Staines Town, Woking, and Slough Town.

Playing career

Parsons was born in Amersham, Buckinghamshire and began his youth career at Crystal Palace, signing professional terms in July 1965. However, his appearances were limited as John Jackson was the regular first team 'keeper. His four League appearances came at the end of the 1966–7 season, making his debut in a home 2–1 win over Birmingham City on 22 April. In August 1970, Parsons moved on to Cardiff City, where he made 17 appearances over the next four years, before brief spells at Fulham and Reading. Parsons then moved into non-league football with Staines Town in 1975. In 1977, he moved to Woking and subsequently joined Slough Town in 1980 for a fee of £3,000. He remained as a player with Slough Town until November 1983 and in October that year scored the winning goal in a 3–2 win over Hampton F.C in the FA Cup third qualifying round.

Although English-born, Parsons represented Wales at under-23 level and also played for an Isthmian League representative XI.

Personal life
Parsons is married with two children and after retirement lived in the Eton area where he ran a newsagent's shop.

References

External links

Profile at sloughtownfc.net
Frank Parsons at holmesdale.net

1947 births
Living people
English footballers
Association football goalkeepers
People from Amersham
Crystal Palace F.C. players
Cardiff City F.C. players
Reading F.C. players
Fulham F.C. players
Staines Town F.C. players
Woking F.C. players
Slough Town F.C. players
Wales under-23 international footballers
English Football League players